Dānyāl, Prince of Bengal (d. 1500s), also known as Dulāl Ghāzī (Bengali–Assamese: দুলাল গাজী), was the eldest son of the Sultan of Bengal Alauddin Hussain Shah. He performed official duties and engagements on behalf of his father. In 1495, Danyal secured a peace treaty with the Delhi Sultanate in Bihar, and served as the regional Governor of Bihar under the Bengal Sultanate. He was appointed as the Governor of Kamata following its conquest in 1498.

Early life and background
Danyal was born in the 15th-century into an aristocratic Bengali Muslim Sunni family in the Bengal Sultanate. In 1494, his father Husain, the Wazir (prime minister) of Bengal, established a new ruling dynasty of the Sultanate after defeating Sultan Shamsuddin Muzaffar Shah. Danyal is thought to be the eldest son of Husain Shah. Among his seventeen other brothers and at least eleven sisters, Nasrat and Mahmud were future Sultans of Bengal.

Princeship
As the prince of the Sultanate of Bengal, Danyal played several important roles during his father's reign. Sikandar Lodi, the Afghan ruler of the Delhi Sultanate, led an expedition to Bengal in 1495 as a result of Danyal's father granting refuge to Hussain Shah Sharqi of the defeated Jaunpur Sultanate. Danyal was appointed by his father to command the Bengali army against Lodi's forces. The two armies met at Barh, and Danyal managed to form a treaty, thus saving Bengal from a possible invasion. The treaty made the town of Barh be the official border of the two sultanates.

In 903 AH (1497-1498 CE), Danyal was responsible for the construction of a vault at the Munger Fort in Bihar and an inscription commemorating this was hung on the eastern wall of the nearby Dargah of Shah Nafa (also known as Pir Nafa). There are also local legends about Danyal that are prevalent, and it is generally thought that Danyal ultimately constructed the dargah too.

In 1498, he took part in the Conquest of Kamata commanded by Shah Ismail Ghazi against King Nilambar of the Khen dynasty. Following the victory, his father appointed him as the governor of the newly conquered region; that reached up to Hajo and intended to expand to Central Assam.

On Eid al-Adha 905 AH (July 1500), Danyal constructed a congregational mosque in Bengal. Danyal governed Kamata for several more years until the Assamese Bhuyans led by Harup Narayan led a campaign against him. In this campaign, the Bhuyans seized and killed Danyal and his officers, thus ending the Sultanate's short rule over the territory some time before 1509. Musundar Ghazi succeeded Danyal as Bengal's representative in Kamrup.

See also
 List of rulers of Bengal
 History of Bengal
 History of India

References

Bibliography

 
 
 
 

1515 deaths
15th-century births
Sunni Muslims
16th-century Indian Muslims
15th-century Indian Muslims
Hussain Shahi dynasty
15th-century Bengalis
16th-century Bengalis
Bengal Sultanate officers